A list of films produced in Egypt in 1979. For an A-Z list of films currently on Wikipedia, see :Category:Egyptian films.

External links
 Egyptian films of 1979 at the Internet Movie Database
 Egyptian films of 1979 elCinema.com

Lists of Egyptian films by year
1979 in Egypt
Lists of 1979 films by country or language